René Dumont (March 13, 1904 – June 18, 2001) was a French engineer in agronomy, a sociologist, and an environmental politician.

Biography 
Dumont was born in Cambrai, Nord, in the north of France. His father was a professor in agriculture and his grandfather was a farmer. He graduated from the INA P-G, as an engineer in agronomy. First sent to Vietnam (1929) at the end of his studies, he was disgusted by colonialism and returned to Paris to spend most of his career as a professor of agricultural sciences (1933–74).
René Dumont started his career as a promoter of the use of chemical fertilizers and mechanisation. He wrote articles in La Terre Française (Pétainist weekly journal), favoring agricultural corporatism. However, he was one of the first to denounce damages from the Green Revolution ("Révolution Verte") and to fight agricultural productivism. He was an expert with the United Nations and FAO, and wrote about 30 books. He traveled widely and had a good understanding of farming issues in underdeveloped countries.

He advocated:
 demographic control
 energy savings
 international cooperation to help poor nations
 soil quality preservation and remediation

He considered development not to be so much a question of money, fertilizer, or seeds, but a careful balance of the three. He advocated relations between humans and their fields that relied foremost on relations between humans themselves, social relationships being the basis for proper agricultural and industrial development. Finally, he believed the basis for good social relationships between humans was good relationships between men and women, thus arguing demographic control relied on female emancipation.

Ahead of his time, the most famous French agronomist, well known for his red-pullover, surprised French people by showing on TV an apple and a glass of water, telling them how precious these natural resources were, and predicting the future price of oil. Dumont was one of the first to explain the consequences of what was to be called globalization, demographic explosion, productivism, pollution, shantytowns, malnutrition, rift between northern and southern countries. He was also one of the first to use the term "développement durable" (sustainable development).

He ran for President in 1974 as the first ecologist candidate, and won 1.32% of the votes. His campaign director was Brice Lalonde. That election opened the way to political ecology. The French political ecology was founded by Dumont and is under-developed countries oriented, against war, against capitalism and for solidarity. Some consider it not sufficiently rooted in deep ecology.

Dumont is considered to be the forefather of the French Green Party. In a statement, France's Green Party called Dumont "the man who made it possible to bring environmental policies in a direct and natural manner into the political world".

He wrote a best-selling book, L’Afrique noire est mal partie (1962).

Dumont was a founding member of ATTAC.

Writings (selection)
Cuba, Socialism and Development, Grove Press, 1970
Cuba, ¿es socialista? Editorial Tiempo Nuevo S.A., Venezuela, 1970
Voyages en France d'un agronome, Nouv. éd. rev. et augm., Paris: Génin, 1956
Révolution dans les campagnes chinoises, Paris: Éditions du Seuil, 1957
Terres vivantes, Paris: Plon, 1961. English translation Lands Alive, London: Merlin Press, 1964
L’Afrique noire est mal partie, 1962. English translation False Start in Africa, New York: Praeger, 1966; London: Earthscan, 1988.
Nous allons à la famine, English translation The Hungry Future, New York: Praeger, 1969
Types of Rural Economy: Studies in World Agriculture, London: Methuen, 1970
Notes sur les implications sociales de la "révolution verte" dans quelques pays d'Afrique, Genève, 1971
La campagne de René Dumont et du mouvement écologique: naissance de l'écologie politique; déclarations, interviews, tracts, manifestes, articles, rapports, sondages, récits et nombreux autres textes, Paris: Pauvert, 1974
l'Utopie ou la Mort, 1973. English translation Utopia or Else ..., Universe Pub, 1975
Agronome de la faim, Paris: Laffont, 1974
Chine, la révolution culturale, Paris: Seuil, 1976
 L'Afrique étranglée, 1980, Nouv. éd., rev., corr. et mis à jour: Paris: Seuil, 1982. English translation Stranglehold on Africa, London: Deutsch, 1983
(with Nicholas Cohen), The Growth of Hunger: a new politics of agriculture, London: Boyars, 1980 - This book is based on René Dumont's ideas as contained in the 1975 publication La croissance de la famine.
Finis Les Lendemains Qui Chantent
 T.1 : Albanie, Pologne, Nicaragua, Paris: Seuil, 1983
 T.2 : Surpeuplée, Totalitaire, La Cnine Decollectivise, Paris: Seuil, 1984
 T.3 : Bangladesh-Nepal, "L'Aide" Contre Le développement, Paris: Seuil, 1985
 Pour l'Afrique, j'accuse: le journal d'un agronome au Sahel en voie de destruction, Paris: Plon, 1986
 Un monde intolérable: le libéralisme en question, Paris: Seuil, 1988
 Démocratie pour l'Afrique: la longue marche de l'Afrique noire vers la liberté, Paris: Seuil, 1991
La culture du riz dans le delta du Tonkin, Paris: Maison des Sciences de l'Homme, 1995

Secondary literature

 J.-P. Besset, René Dumont, une vie saisie par l’écologie, Paris: Stock, 1992
 Marc Dufumier (dir.), Un agronome dans son siècle. Actualité de René Dumont, Association pour la création de la Fondation René Dumont/Éditions Karthala/INA P-G, coll. « Hommes et Sociétés », Paris, 2002
 « René Dumont, un agronome d'exception » in: Ingénieurs de la vie : la revue des ingénieurs de l'INA P-G, Mazarine, Paris, 2005
 René Dumont, citoyen de la planète Terre, a documentary by Bernard Baissat, co-production La Lanterne/France 3, 105 minutes, 1992 more information

See also
Alain Lipietz

References 

1904 births
2001 deaths
French sociologists
Environmental sociologists
People from Cambrai
Food and Agriculture Organization officials
The Greens (France) politicians
French male writers
French officials of the United Nations
20th-century French male writers
Candidates in the 1974 French presidential election